The Yahudi Hamam is an Ottoman-era bath in Thessaloniki, Greece. Located at the intersection of Vasileos Irakleiou and Frangini streets, the bath dates to the 16th century. Its name means "Bath of the Jews", as the area was predominantly settled by Sephardi Jews. It was also named Pazar Hamam, due to its location in the central market-place of the city.

References 

Infrastructure completed in the 16th century
Ottoman architecture in Thessaloniki
Ottoman baths in Greece
16th-century architecture in Greece